"La Respuesta" is a song by American singer Becky G and Colombian singer Maluma. It was released by Kemosabe Records, RCA Records and Sony Music Latin on April 19, 2019. The track was written by Gomez, Maluma and it is produced by Edgar Barrera, and co-produced by Luis Barrera Jr. and Daniel Buitrago. It is a reggaeton song about female empowerment and breaking gender stereotypes. The accompanying music video was directed by Daniel Duran. The song was originally released as a single from Gomez's debut studio album Mala Santa but was ultimately scrapped.

Background
Gomez stated that the song is "about breaking free from stereotypes", and she hopes that it "serves to empower young women". It is Gomez and Maluma's second collaboration, following the remix of "Mala Mía" released in 2018. It was characterized as a "power anthem about breaking stereotypes".

In other media
The song was going to be on the main tracklist of Just Dance 2020, but was removed for an unknown reason. It was later brought back on Just Dance Unlimited.

Music video
The music video was released alongside the song on April 19. It was called "retro-inspired" with "cute costumes" and "vibrant set-pieces" by Idolator. As of November 2019, the clip has over 255 million views.

Charts

Certifications

References

2019 singles
2019 songs
Becky G songs
Maluma songs
Songs written by Maluma (singer)
Songs written by Edgar Barrera
Spanish-language songs
Song recordings produced by Edgar Barrera
La Respuesta